Parental respect is deference to parents

Parental respect may specifically refer to:
 Filial piety, a tradition in East Asia
 Familialism
 Islam and children, for the traditions in Islam
 Pietas, a tradition in ancient Rome
 Honour thy father and thy mother, a commandment in Judaism and Christianity